Michael Nikolay (born 13 December 1956) is a retired German gymnast. He competed at the 1976 and 1980 Summer Olympics in all artistic gymnastics events and won a bronze and a silver medal with the East German team, respectively. Individually he won two bronze medals in the pommel horse at both Games; he also finished fourth on the horizontal bar and on the parallel bars in 1980.

At the world championships, he won a gold medal in the pommel horse in 1981 and a bronze in the team competition in 1978. He also won a European silver in the pommel horse in 1977.

References

1956 births
German male artistic gymnasts
Medalists at the World Artistic Gymnastics Championships
World champion gymnasts
Living people
People from East Berlin
Gymnasts from Berlin
Olympic gymnasts of East Germany
Gymnasts at the 1976 Summer Olympics
Gymnasts at the 1980 Summer Olympics
Olympic silver medalists for East Germany
Olympic bronze medalists for East Germany
Olympic medalists in gymnastics
Medalists at the 1980 Summer Olympics
Medalists at the 1976 Summer Olympics
20th-century German people
21st-century German people